The 2022–23 Creighton Bluejays men's basketball team represents Creighton University in the 2022–23 NCAA Division I men's basketball season. The Bluejays are coached by 13th-year head coach Greg McDermott and play their home games at the CHI Health Center Omaha in Omaha, Nebraska as members of the Big East Conference.

Previous season
The Bluejays finished the 2021–22 season 23–12, 12–7 in Big East play to finish in fourth place. As the No. 4 seed in the Big East tournament, they defeated Marquette and Providence, before losing to Villanova in the Championship. They received an at-large bid to the NCAA tournament as the No. 9 seed in the Midwest Region, where they defeated San Diego State in the first round before losing to Kansas in the second round.

Offseason

Departures

Incoming transfers

Recruiting classes

2022 recruiting class

2023 recruiting class

Roster

Schedule and results

|-
!colspan=12 style=| Exhibition

|-
!colspan=12 style=| Non-conference regular season

|-
!colspan=9 style=|Big East regular season

|-
!colspan=12 style=| Big East tournament

|-
!colspan=12 style=""| NCAA tournament

Source

References

Creighton Bluejays men's basketball seasons
Creighton
Creighton
Creighton
Creighton